Elizabeth Curzon Hoxie House is a historic home located in Newburyport, Massachusetts, United States.  It was built in 1859 for Elizabeth Curzon Hoxie (1822 – 1898), a great-aunt of novelist John P. Marquand, and is a two-story Vernacular Victorian-style brick dwelling.

There is a wooden addition at the rear of the home whose date is unknown.

Elizabeth Curzon Hoxie was a housekeeper. Her husband was John Anson Hoxie (1814 – 1894).

References

External links
Hoxie, Elizabeth Curzon House - Massachusetts Cultural Resource Information System
Elizabeth Curson Hoxie - Find A Grave
John Anson Hoxie - Find A Grave

Victorian architecture in Massachusetts
Houses completed in 1859
Houses in Newburyport, Massachusetts